Clement Wani Konga served as Governor of Central Equatoria in South Sudan from 2005 to 2015.

References

South Sudanese politicians
South Sudanese state governors
Living people
People from Central Equatoria
Year of birth missing (living people)
Place of birth missing (living people)